Bibata Ouédraogo is a Burkinabé feminist, women's rights activist and former school teacher.

Career 
She is well known for her efforts in promoting sexual and reproductive rights as well as rights to maternal health for women in Burkina Faso. She has also conducted research and awareness campaigns about fighting HIV/AIDS and serves as a strong advocate against gender discrimination and child marriage.

She currently serves as the President of Ouahigouya branch of AFDEB which is a women's association for the development of Burkina Faso. She has also worked as a teacher and retired from teaching in 2013. She continued her humanitarian efforts and activism even after her retirement from teaching. 

In August 2021, she was listed as one of the seven African women activists who deserve a Wikipedia article by the Global Citizen, an international organisation and advocacy organisation.

References 

Living people
Burkinabé activists
Burkinabé women
Women's rights activists
Year of birth missing (living people)
21st-century Burkinabé people
21st-century women